Allaire State Park  is a park located in Howell and in Wall Township in Monmouth County, New Jersey, United States, near the borough of Farmingdale, operated and maintained by the New Jersey Division of Parks and Forestry and is part of the New Jersey Coastal Heritage Trail Route. The park is known for its restored 19th century ironworks, Allaire Village, on the park premises. It is named after James P. Allaire, founder of the Howell Works at the same site. The park also hosts the Pine Creek Railroad, a tourist railroad.

The park, which is located in the coastal plain geographic region of New Jersey, is an example of podzolic soils. These soils are high in iron particle content and are fairly acidic.

Picnic facilities including charcoal grills, tables, playgrounds and sanitary facilities are available within the developed area of the park.
The Manasquan River flows eastward through the park, seasonal canoe rentals are offered offsite by private vendors. The Manasquan River is classified as fresh water within the park and requires a fishing license. The park charges an entrance fee on weekends in the summer.

Allaire Village
The park's signature feature is the Allaire Village, originally named Howell Works in the early 19th century. It was a prosperous industrial town producing pig iron and cast iron from the surrounding bog iron deposits. The buildings which remain and have been restored today include a general store, blacksmith shop, carpenter's shop, manager's house, foreman's house and a church. One of the workers' row house buildings has been recreated and now houses a Visitor Center and Museum (free).
The historic village is run by a non-profit organization independent of the park and charges a nominal fee to enter the buildings.

Pine Creek Railroad
The Pine Creek Railroad is an excursion rail line operated by railroad enthusiasts of the New Jersey Museum of Transportation. The museum, an independent not-for-profit organization, moved its locomotives and rolling stock to Allaire State Park in 1962 where it runs weekend trains on a ½ mile loop of track through the park. The physical rail line for the railroad was repurposed from a disused spur of track at a former rug company, 'A&M Karadheusian Rug Company' in Freehold, NJ. The Monmouth County Board of Freeholders sold the track for $1.00 to the museum for use at Allaire State Park.

The Pine Creek Railroad, like Allaire Village is an independent private organization operating within the park.

Nature Interpretive Center
The Nature Interpretive Center currently operates weekends during the summer.

Campground
The Allaire State Park family campground provides flush toilets, shower facilities, and a seasonal trailer sanitary dump station.  The campground is open all year.  Prices range from $20 a night for a regular tent site, to $30 for a yurt, and $40 for a shelter.

There are 45 tent and trailer sites with picnic tables available for guests with their own camping equipment. In addition there are four yurts (circular tents built on a wood deck), and six cabin-like shelters available for rent. There is also a group campground located on the south side of the park, which has an area with six large sites.

Trails
Nature Center Trail (Red)
Canal Trail (Pink)
An easy hiking trail spanning  with a loop at one end.
Brisbane Trail (Orange)
An easy-to-moderate multi-use trail spanning .
Upper Squankum Trail (Yellow)
An easy-to-moderate multi-use trail spanning  most of which is in the location of former Freehold and Jamesburg Agricultural Railroad tracks.
Capital to Coast Trail (Purple)
Pine Trail (Orange)
A moderate multi-use trail spanning . 
Mountain Laurel Trail (Blue)
An easy-to-moderate multi-use trail spanning .
Oak Trail (White)
An easy-to-moderate multi-use path spanning  that splits off from the Pine Trail to become more difficult before joining the Mountain Laurel Trail.
Boy Scout (Pink)
An easy-to-moderate multi-use trail spanning  looping around the group camping sites.

All trail classifications and distances are made by the New Jersey Department of Environmental Protection, which oversees the State Parks. Note: Bicycles are not permitted on trails within the developed part of the park. Allaire's mountain biking trails may be accessed by riding the Edgar Felix Bikeway to Hospital road on the eastern edge of the park.

References

External links

 NY-NJTC: Allaire State Park Trail Details and Info
 New Jersey Museum of Transportation
 Nature Programs at Allaire State Park – Conserve Wildlife Foundation of New Jersey
 Allaire State Park Trail Map

State parks of New Jersey
Parks in Monmouth County, New Jersey
Howell Township, New Jersey
Wall Township, New Jersey
Nature centers in New Jersey